Shakhovo is a rural locality (a selo) and the administrative center of Shakhovskoye Rural Settlement, Prokhorovsky District, Belgorod Oblast, Russia. The population was 317 as of 2010. There are 6 streets.

Geography 
Shakhovo is located 21 km south of Prokhorovka (the district's administrative centre) by road. Kleymenovo is the nearest rural locality.

References 

Rural localities in Prokhorovsky District
Korochansky Uyezd